The Fame Game is an Indian Hindi-language mystery family drama streaming television series on Netflix created by Sri Rao and directed by Bejoy Nambiar and Karishma Kohli. Produced by Karan Johar and Somen Mishra under the banner Dharmatic Entertainment, the series stars Madhuri Dixit, Sanjay Kapoor, Manav Kaul, Suhasini Mulay, Lakshvir Saran and Muskkaan Jaferi in lead roles.

The series revolves around a Bollywood actress named Anamika Anand who suddenly goes missing one day.
It premiered on Netflix on 25 February 2022.

Premise
Anamika Anand is a Bollywood star who has a glamorous career and a seemingly idyllic family - but there is more to her personal life than meets the eye. She is physically and verbally abused by her husband, Nikhil More. While her daughter Amara aspires to be a great star like her mother, highlighting nepotism in the current Bollywood industry, her son Avi has his own issues to face including his sexuality. Additionally, Anamika’s mother consistently berates her and other members of the family and uses manipulative techniques to achieve her goals. Her only solace is Manish Khanna, her frequent co-star and past lover. Anamika's sudden disappearance puts her personal life in the limelight and thus begins the quest to find her and the person behind her disappearance, which leads to the unveiling of many dark secrets.

Cast
 Madhuri Dixit as Anamika Anand/Vijju Joshi, Nikhil's wife, Avinash and Amara's mother.
 Sanjay Kapoor as Nikhil More, Anamika's husband, and Amara' and Avinash's father.
 Manav Kaul as Manish Khanna, Anamika's lover and Avinash's biological father.
 Suhasini Mulay as Kalyani Anand, Anamika's mother.
 Rajshri Deshpande as Shobha Trivedi, Police officer investigating Anamika's case.
 Lakshvir Saran as Avinash (Avi), Anamika’s son.
 Muskkaan Jaferi as Amara, Anamika and Nikhil's daughter, Madhav's girlfriend.
 Gagan Arora as Madhav, Amara's boyfriend, Anamika's obsessed fan.
 Danish Sood as Samar, Avinash's boyfriend.
 Kashyap Shangari as Billy, Anamika's makeup artist.
 Shubhangi Latkar as Lata, the housekeeper
 Makarand Deshpande as Harilal, the movie poster painter.
 Ayesha Kaduskar as Tabitha Khanna, Manish Khanna and Sneha's daughter
 Harpreet Vir Singh as Financer PK Sharma
 Sanjay Dutt as cameo appearance from Kalank, when Amara tries to re-enact Anamika's role in the movie.

Soundtrack

The official song video "Dupatta Mera" focuses on the dance performance of Madhuri Dixit, while the promotional video also features Varun Dhawan, Siddharth Malhotra, Ishaan Khatter, Riteish Deshmukh, Jackie Shroff and Johnny Lever.

Production

Development
Announced in May 2020 with the title Finding Anamika, the show was eventually renamed as The Fame Game.

Release
The series consisting of eight episodes premiered on Netflix on 25 February 2022.

Casting
Madhuri Dixit was cast in the titular role, and was joined by Sanjay Kapoor and Manav Kaul as the leads. The cast also included Lakshvir Saran and Muskkaan Jaferi as Madhuri’s character’s children.

Reception
The series received positive reviews from critics. India TV gave the series 3 and a half stars out of five and wrote 'Madhuri Dixit, Sanjay Kapoor and ensemble deliver pitch-perfect family drama'. It further added 'The Fame Game on Netflix takes the dysfunctional family trope and packs it with suspense and drama, making it an enjoyable and binge-worthy series.

Koimoi gave the series 3 stars and wrote 'Madhuri Dixit Nene convincingly becomes a mystery dressed in uncertain layers playing an extension to her real self'. The review further praised the writer Sri Rao's script by calling it impeccable, perfect and idealistic. Saibal Chatterjee of NDTV too gave it 3 stars and wrote 'The Incandescence Of Madhuri Dixit - Dive Right In'. He praised Dixit's performance by saying 'She gets into the skin of the protagonist with such dazzling panache that the line separating the character from the performer is frequently breached'. Sukanya Verma of Rediff gave the series 3 and Half stars and wrote 'What The Fame Game showcases is the depth and marvels of Madhuri as she switches between star and human, mother and woman'.

References

External links
 
 

Hindi-language Netflix original programming
2022 Indian television series debuts